Mike Larrabee (Michael Denny Larrabee; December 2, 1933 – April 22, 2003) was an American athlete, winner of two gold medals at the 1964 Summer Olympics.

Born in Hollywood, California and raised in Ventura, Larrabee was a young running talent in the mid-1950s. In 1952, his athletic performances earned him a scholarship at the University of Southern California, from which he graduated as a geology major. A series of injuries hampered his running career, causing him to miss out on the 1956 and 1960 Olympics, but he had his best season in 1964.

He won his only AAU title in 400 m, then he won the 400 m (tying the world record of 44.9 seconds) at the 1964 Olympic Trials in Los Angeles. In the Tokyo Olympics final, Larrabee was in fifth place going into the final turn, then passed everyone in front of him with a burst of speed to win the gold medal in 45.1. Larrabee also ran the second leg on United States gold medal winning 4 × 400 m relay team that won in the world record time of 3:00.7.

After the Tokyo Olympics Larrabee worked as a mathematics teacher at James Monroe High School, ran a beverage distributing company with his brother and worked part-time as Adidas’ U.S. shoe representative to track and field, a position that allowed him to travel and keep connected to the sport.

Larrabee remained physically active well after his running career had wound down, taking up tennis, scuba diving, skiing, hiking (for which he raised llamas as pack animals) and mountain climbing.

Although he was diagnosed with advanced pancreatic cancer in 2001 and was only expected to live a few weeks, he continued to live life to the fullest for two more years, thanks to chemotherapy treatments.  Mike Larrabee died in his home at Santa Maria, California, aged 69.  He was posthumously added to the National Track and Field Hall of Fame in December 2003.

The stadium at Ventura High School, which he attended, is named for him.

References

External links
 
 Obituary at IAAF.org
 
 
 
 

1933 births
2003 deaths
Deaths from pancreatic cancer
People from Greater Los Angeles
People from Ventura, California
American male sprinters
World record setters in athletics (track and field)
Athletes (track and field) at the 1964 Summer Olympics
Olympic gold medalists for the United States in track and field
University of Southern California alumni
Deaths from cancer in California
Sportspeople from Santa Maria, California
Track and field athletes from California
Medalists at the 1964 Summer Olympics
Sportspeople from Ventura County, California